Dedebit Football Club (Amharic: ደደቢት የእግር ኳስ ክለብ) is an Ethiopian football club based in Mekelle, Ethiopia. They play in the Ethiopian Premier League, the top tier of Ethiopian football. The team officially moved its home base from the capital Addis Ababa to Mekelle after the 2017–18 Season.

History
Dedebit was founded in 1997 as a youth project at an Army Officers' Residential compound.

Dedebit fired head coach Yohannes Sahle three matches into the 2016/17 Ethiopian premier league season.

After the 2017/18 season the team announced that due to financial restrictions they would only sign players with low wage demands and would let go of players earning high wages including star striker Getaneh Kebede.

Domestic competition 
Dedebit were promoted to the Ethiopian Premier League after a successful 2008–09 season in the second tier of Ethiopian Football, making their Premier League debut in the 2009–10 season. In a surprising show of form debutantes Dedebit grabbed the headlines when they topped the table early in the season. They enjoyed a good run on top during that season until eventually finishing runners-up to perennial favorites St. George S.C. However, the team did not end the season leaving empty handed as they were able to lift the Ethiopian Cup, in the process exacting revenge on their Premier league foes St. George S.C. defeating them 1–0 in the final. In the 2010–11 season Dedebit finished 3rd in table, staying competitive but finishing behind St George and champions Ethiopian Coffee. They would continue this form the following season (2011–12) finishing runners-up again to the champions St. George.

The 2012–13 season was the most successful in the club's history as they were able to win the Ethiopian Premier League for the first time in their history. Many of the players from this title winning team such as Getaneh Kebede would go on to star in the Ethiopian national team.

African competition

CAF Confederation Cup 
Winning the 2009–10 Ethiopian Cup meant Dedebit had qualified for the preliminary round of the 2011 CAF Confederation Cup. The following year saw Dedebit were drawn against Young Africans of Tanzania in the preliminary round of the competition. The first leg, held in Dar-es-selam, was a high scoring affair with the match ending in a 4–4 draw. What was notable about this match was that it was the club's first competitive continental and international match in its history. Having already collected 4 away goals, Dedebit had an outstanding second leg cruising to a 2–0 win at home, advancing into the first round 6–4 on aggregate. In the first round of the competition Dedebit were matched up against Egyptian side Haras El Hodoud SC. The first leg saw Dedebit get thrashed 4–0 in Alexandria, suffering their first defeat of the competition. On the return leg in Addis Ababa they were only able to earn a 1–1 draw (finishing 1–5 on aggregate), in the process being eliminated from the competition.

Dedebit qualified for the 2013 CAF Confederation Cup, but unfortunately they met the same fate as two years prior, being eliminated in the first round of the competition.

CAF Champions League 
By virtue of winning the 2012–13 Ethiopian Premier League, Dedebit qualified for the preliminary round of the 2014 CAF Champions League. Drawn against KMKM of Zanzibar in the preliminary round, the first leg in Addis Ababa saw Dedebit easily handle their opponents cruising to a 3–0 win. The second leg was a different story as KMKM were dominant on the day winning 2–0, but falling short of leveling the fixture on aggregate as Dedebit were able to advance to the next round. In the first round Dedebit met CS Sfaxien of Tunisia with the first leg held in Addis Ababa, where Dedebit fell 2–1. The return leg in Tunis saw CS Sfaxien walking away victorious 2–0, advancing 4–1 on aggregate and eliminating Dedebit in the process.

Grounds 
They play games at the Addis Ababa Stadium, which has a capacity of 35,000. Their original home ground is the Abebe Bikila Stadium that has a capacity of 30,000, but as of 2017 it is in process of being renovated. Due to the club moving its home base to Mekelle as of 2018, the club's home ground was accordingly changed to Mekelle Stadium.

Sponsorships 
The main sponsor of the club as of the 2017/2018 season is Messebo Cement, an Ethiopian cement company. The official kit supplier of the club is the Italian sportswear maker Errea.

Women's club 
Dedebit F.C. women's side plays in the Ethiopian Women's Premier League, having won the league three times.

Achievements
Ethiopian Premier League: 1
2012–13.

Ethiopian Cup: 2
2009–10, 2012–13

Ethiopian Super Cup: 0

Performance in CAF competitions
CAF Champions League: 1 appearance
2014 – First Round

CAF Confederation Cup: 2 appearances
2011 – First Round
2013 – First Round

Current squad

Former coaches

  Mehmet Tayfun Türkmen

Club officials 
Chairman:  Colonel Awel Abdurehim

References

External links
 Latest Ethiopian Football News
 Official club website

Football clubs in Ethiopia
Football clubs in Addis Ababa
1997 establishments in Ethiopia
Association football clubs established in 1997
Military association football clubs in Ethiopia
Mekelle